Karuma is a settlement in the Western Region of Uganda.

Location
Karuma is in Kiryandongo District, Bunyoro sub-region.

Overview
Karuma is where the Lira–Kamdini–Karuma Road connects to the Kampala–Karuma Road and the Karuma–Olwiyo–Pakwach–Nebbi–Arua Road.

See also
Murchison Falls National Park
List of cities and towns in Uganda
List of roads in Uganda

References

External links
Uganda: Government secures $400m World Bank loan for roads
Sh4.2b compensation for Karuma power project starts

Populated places in Western Region, Uganda
Cities in the Great Rift Valley
Kiryandongo District